Ballygill North is a townland in County Antrim, Northern Ireland. It contains Skerriagh, the northernmost point of Northern Ireland.

See also 
List of townlands in County Antrim
List of places in County Antrim

References

Townlands of County Antrim